Kireyevsk is a town and the administrative center of Kireyevsky District in Tula Oblast, Russia, located on the Olen River,  southeast of Tula, the administrative center of the oblast. Population:

History
It has been known since the second half of the 18th century as the Cossack village of Kireyevskaya. Iron ore deposits started to be developed in the 19th century. During the Soviet times, the village was granted urban-type settlement status and renamed Kireyevka. It was granted town status and renamed Kireyevsk in 1956.

Administrative and municipal status
Within the framework of administrative divisions, Kireyevsk serves as the administrative center of Kireyevsky District. As an administrative division, it is incorporated within Kireyevsky District as Kireyevsk Town Under District Jurisdiction. As a municipal division, Kireyevsk Town Under District Jurisdiction, together with Oktyabrsky Rural Okrug of Kireyevsky District (which comprises three rural localities), is incorporated within Kireyevsky Municipal District as Kireyevsk Urban Settlement.

References

Sources

Notes

Cities and towns in Tula Oblast